Anita Burdman Feferman (July 27, 1927 – April 9, 2015) was an American historian of mathematics and biographer, known for her biographies of Jean van Heijenoort and (with her husband, logician Solomon Feferman) of Alfred Tarski.

Life
Feferman was born on July 27, 1927. She was originally from Los Angeles, and attended Hollywood High School and the University of California, Los Angeles before earning a bachelor's degree in 1948 from the University of California, Berkeley. She became a schoolteacher in the Oakland, California school system, and earned another degree in teaching from UC Berkeley. In 1956 her husband Solomon Feferman took a position at Stanford University, and she moved with him and their two daughters from the East Bay to the San Francisco Peninsula. She died on April 9, 2015.

Books
At Stanford, Feferman became a member of a biography seminar led by Barbara A. Babcock and Diane Middlebrook. Her first biography, of Jean van Heijenoort, was Politics, Logic, and Love: The Life of Jean van Heijenoort (Jones and Bartlett, 1993), also published as From Trotsky to Gödel: The Life of Jean van Heijenoort (CRC Press, 2001). With Solomon Feferman, she was the co-author of a biography of Alfred Tarski, Alfred Tarski: Life and Logic (Cambridge University Press, 2004).

References

External links
Feferman (Anita Burdman) Papers, Stanford University Archives, via Online Archive of California

1927 births
2015 deaths
University of California, Berkeley alumni
American biographers
American historians of mathematics